Louise Barnes (born 26 April 1974) is a South African actress. Barnes gained recognition in South Africa for various roles in locally produced films and television series'. She is best known for her role in the 2009 South African/UK horror film,  Surviving Evil, in which she starred alongside Billy Zane, Christina Cole and Natalie Mendoza. She also played Miranda Barlow in the 2014 American television series Black Sails, produced by Michael Bay and Jonathan E. Steinberg.

Life and education
Barnes was born in KwaZulu-Natal and graduated at the University of the Witwatersrand with an Honours Degree in Dramatic Art. She lives in Johannesburg with her husband and daughter. She once co-owned a health studio after training in the United States as an instructor of Bikram yoga. She has received critical acclaim for her performance on the series Scandal! for which she won a SAFTA award for Best Actress in a TV Soap.

Career
Barnes has starred in numerous South African produced films and series including Egoli, 7de Laan, Binnelanders, Scandal!, Sorted, Suburban Bliss, S.O.S. and the South African/Canadian co-production Jozi-H. She appears in the 2014 American television series Black Sails, for which she has received critical acclaim for her performance. Entertainment weekly called her character "intriguing" and "mysterious". She reprised her role in the second season which filmed in Cape Town, South Africa and aired in 2015.

Filmography

Film

Television

Video Games

Theater
Life x 3 – Sonja. By Alan Swerdlow at Theatre on the Square.
Fanie’s Angel – Tish. By Sylvaine Strike at KKNK.
Kindertranspor – Faith. By Barbara Rubin at Market Theatre.
Beautiful Bodies – Clair. By Mark Graham at Wits Amphitheatre.
Heresy – Frances. By Anthony Ackerman at Wits Amphitheatre.
Isabella – Melisa. Directed by Lucy Voss-Price at Wits Amphitheatre.

References

External links
 TVSA

1974 births
Living people
South African film actresses
South African television actresses
South African stage actresses
University of the Witwatersrand alumni
People from Johannesburg